The super regions of the Philippines are an informal and de facto defunct grouping of parts of regions and provinces of the Philippines based on their economic strengths. According to Executive Order No. 561, which establishes these regions, 

The creation of super regions was first proposed by the President Gloria Macapagal Arroyo in her sixth State of the Nation Address to group the selected regions/provinces by their economic strengths. Each super region is headed by a Development Champion.

Composition

North Luzon Agribusiness Quadrangle 
 Ilocos Region
 Cordillera Administrative Region
 Cagayan Valley
 northern portion of northern provinces of Central Luzon
 Aurora (north of Baler)
 Nueva Ecija (north of Cabanatuan)
 Tarlac (north of Tarlac City)
 Zambales (north of Subic)

Metro Luzon Urban Beltway 
or simply Luzon Urban Beltway.
 the rest of Central Luzon
 Aurora (south of Baler, including Baler)
 Bataan
 Bulacan
 Nueva Ecija (south of Cabanatuan, including Cabanatuan)
 Pampanga
 Tarlac (south of Tarlac City, including Tarlac)
 Zambales (south of Subic, including Subic and Olongapo)
 National Capital Region
 Calabarzon
 Mimaropa (excluding the provinces of Palawan and Romblon)
 Marinduque
 Occidental Mindoro
 Oriental Mindoro

Central Philippines Region 
also known as Tourism Super Region.
 the rest of Mimaropa
 Romblon
 Palawan
 Bicol Region
 Western Visayas
 Central Visayas
 Eastern Visayas
 Northern Mindanao
 Camiguin
 Caraga
 Siargao

The Tourism Super Region is a concept of development plan of the government. Under this concept, the government intends to focus development and investments on tourism related projects. This super region is actually a cluster of five regions plus some parts of Caraga. It boasts of a wide stretch of beachline, surfing spots, caves, lakes, and historical sites.

Included in the plan is building the infrastructures such as airports, roll-on-roll-off seaports, bus terminals and hotels. Aside from Mactan–Cebu International Airport, the government intends to build international airports in each component region. The Bohol–Panglao International Airport in Bohol in Central Visayas and the Bicol International Airport in Daraga, Albay for the Bicol Region has opened in 2018 and 2021, respectively, while the unutilized Guiuan Airport in Guiuan, Eastern Samar is being planned to be converted into an international airport for Eastern Visayas region. The Kalibo International Airport in Aklan is now open to international flights from Incheon, South Korea due to increasing Korean tourists flocking to Boracay Island. The Bacolod–Silay International Airport in Silay is designated to serve Negros Occidental and Negros Oriental, while the new Iloilo International Airport in Cabatuan, Iloilo, is designated as the international airport for Panay Island together with Kalibo Airport.

Mindanao Super Region 
also known as Agribusiness Mindanao Super Region.
 Zamboanga Peninsula
 Northern Mindanao (except for Camiguin)
 Davao Region
 Soccsksargen
 Caraga (except for Siargao)
 Bangsamoro Autonomous Region in Muslim Mindanao

Cyber corridor 
The cyber corridor traverses the above super regions from Tuguegarao to Davao City.

See also 
Regions of the Philippines
Economy of the Philippines

References

External links
ABS-CBN Interactive   ABS-CBN news about the super regions
North Luzon Super Region: Potentials
North Luzon Super Region: Projects

02
Economy of the Philippines
Subdivisions of the Philippines